Maria Kirilenko was the defending champion, but lost in second round to Peng Shuai.

Svetlana Kuznetsova won the title by defeating Amélie Mauresmo 6–4, 6–0 in the final.

Seeds
The top four seeds received a bye into the second round.

Draw

Finals

Top half

Bottom half

References
 Main and Qualifying Draws (WTA)

2006 WTA Tour
2006 China Open (tennis)